Pablo Fernández (1901 – death date unknown) was a Cuban pitcher who played in the Negro leagues in the 1920s.

A native of Matanzas, Cuba, Fernández played for the Cuban Stars (West) in 1923. In eight recorded appearances on the mound, he posted a 4.58 ERA over 39.1 innings.

References

External links
 and Seamheads

Date of birth missing
Year of death missing
Place of birth missing
Place of death missing
Cuban Stars (West) players
1901 births
Cuban expatriate baseball players in the United States